Muskegon Charter Township is a charter township of Muskegon County in the U.S. state of Michigan.  The population was 17,737 at the 2000 census. The City of Muskegon is at the southwest corner of the township and is administratively autonomous. The township shares all five of the city's zip codes.

The township was organized in 1837. The township claims to be the "oldest Township in the State of Michigan"  as it was the first township officially recognized in the newly created State of Michigan; however, many other townships were created earlier than Muskegon Township.

Geography
According to the United States Census Bureau, the township has a total area of 23.9 square miles (61.9 km2), of which 23.8 square miles (61.7 km2) is land and 0.1 square mile (0.2 km2) (0.25%) is water.

Demographics
As of the census of 2000, there were 17,737 people, 6,581 households, and 4,771 families residing in the township. The racial makeup of the township was 91.46% White, 4.63% African American, 0.95% Native American, 0.28% Asian, 0.01% Pacific Islander, 0.79% from other races, and 1.87% from two or more races. Hispanic or Latino of any race were 3.21% of the population.

There were 6,581 households, out of which 38.6% had children under the age of 18 living with them, 53.1% were married couples living together, 14.7% had a female householder with no husband present, and 27.5% were non-families. 23.2% of all households were made up of individuals, and 11.6% had someone living alone who was 65 years of age or older.  The average household size was 2.64 and the average family size was 3.11.

In the township the population was spread out, with 29.1% under the age of 18, 8.6% from 18 to 24, 28.6% from 25 to 44, 19.8% from 45 to 64, and 13.8% who were 65 years of age or older.  The median age was 34 years. For every 100 females, there were 90.2 males.  For every 100 females age 18 and over, there were 84.2 males.

The median income for a household in the township was $38,634, and the median income for a family was $45,178. Males had a median income of $36,111 versus $24,627 for females. The per capita income for the township was $16,623.  About 8.2% of families and 9.1% of the population were below the poverty line, including 12.7% of those under age 18 and 7.3% of those age 65 or over.

Major highways

Schools 
 Muskegon Technical Academy
 Orchard View Schools
 Reeths-Puffer Schools
 Timberland Academy (National Heritage Academy)

References

External links 
 Muskegon Charter Township

Charter townships in Michigan
Townships in Muskegon County, Michigan